These are tables of congressional delegations from New Hampshire to the United States Senate and United States House of Representatives.

The current dean of the New Hampshire delegation is Senator Jeanne Shaheen, having served in the Senate since 2009.

United States Senate

United States House of Representatives

Current representatives

1789-1793: Three at-large seats

1793-1803: Four at-large seats

1803-1813: Five at-large seats

1813-1833: Six at-large seats

1833-1843: Five at-large seats

1843-1847: Four seats 
From 1843, four seats were allocated at-large. Starting in 1847, however, these seats were represented in districts.

1853-1883: Three districts

1883-present: Two districts

Key

See also

List of United States congressional districts
New Hampshire's congressional districts
Political party strength in New Hampshire

Notes

References

 
 
 Congressional Biographical Directory of the United States 1774–present
 Information from the Clerk of the U.S. House of Representatives

External links
United States Senate official website
United States House of Representatives official website

Politics of New Hampshire
New Hampshire
 
 
Congressional delegations